The Indore-Dewas-Ujjain section of the Western Railway Zone is a partially operational public transit system in the state of Madhya Pradesh. It connects Indore Jn with Ujjain Jn on Ujjain-Bhopal section and  Dewas Jn on Dewas-Maksi section. It is currently operational as a single-track electrified railway line, and is undergoing doubling.

The tentative time of completion of the project is slated to be March 2023. The work is being done by Ratlam railway division of Western Railways.

History 
The track was part of the erstwhile Scindia-Neemuch railway, a branch line from Indore to Ujjain was made operational in the period 1879-1880 during the British Rule.

Current Status
The doubling work in the stretch of railways from Ujjain Jn via Karchha, Dewas Jn, Barlai has been completed and is in operation since Late February 2023.

See also
 Western Railway
 Indore Junction railway station
 Dewas Junction railway station
 Ujjain Junction railway station

References

Transport in Indore
Railway lines in Gujarat
Rail transport in Madhya Pradesh
Transport in Dahod
Proposed railway lines in India